The 2021–22 USC Upstate Spartans men's basketball team represented the University of South Carolina Upstate in the 2021–22 NCAA Division I men's basketball season. The Spartans, led by fourth-year head coach Dave Dickerson, played their home games at the G. B. Hodge Center in Spartanburg, South Carolina as members of the Big South Conference. With the reintroduction of divisions for the first time since the 2013–14 season, the Spartans play in the South Division.

Previous season
The Spartans finished the 2020–21 season 5–18, 5–11 in Big South play to finish in ninth place. In the Big South tournament, they lost in the first round to High Point.

Roster

Schedule and results

|-
!colspan=12 style=| Non-conference regular season

|-
!colspan=12 style=| Big South regular season

|-
!colspan=9 style=| Big South tournament

|-
!colspan=12 style=| The Basketball Classic

Source

References

USC Upstate Spartans men's basketball seasons
USC Upstate Spartans
USC Upstate Spartans men's basketball
USC Upstate Spartans men's basketball
USC Upstate